The diagnostic category pervasive developmental disorders (PDD), as opposed to specific developmental disorders (SDD), was a group of disorders characterized by delays in the development of multiple basic functions including socialization and communication. It was defined by the Diagnostic and Statistical Manual of Mental Disorders (DSM) (from 1980-2013), and the International Classification of Diseases (ICD) (until 2022).

The pervasive developmental disorders included autism, Asperger syndrome, pervasive developmental disorder not otherwise specified (PDD-NOS, i.e., all autism spectrum disorders [ASD]), childhood disintegrative disorder (CDD), overactive disorder associated with intellectual disability and stereotyped movements, and Rett syndrome. The first four of these disorders are commonly called the autism spectrum disorders; the last disorder is much rarer, and is sometimes placed in the autism spectrum and sometimes not.

The terminology PDD and ASD is often used interchangeably and varies depending on location. The fifth edition of the DSM removed PDD as a diagnosis and replaced it with ASD and a measure of the relative severity of the condition. The eleventh edition of the ICD also removed the category.

The onset of pervasive developmental disorders occurs during infancy, but the condition is usually not identified until the child is around three years old. Parents may begin to question the health of their child when developmental milestones are not met, including age appropriate motor movement and speech production.

There is a division among doctors on the use of the term PDD. Many use the term PDD as a short way of saying PDD-NOS (pervasive developmental disorder not otherwise specified). Others use the general category label of PDD because they are hesitant to diagnose very young children with a specific type of PDD, such as autism. Both approaches contribute to confusion about the term, because the term PDD actually refers to a category of disorders and is not a diagnostic label.

Signs and symptoms
Symptoms of PDD may include behavioral and communication problems such as:
 Difficulty using and understanding language
 Difficulty relating to people, objects, and events; for example, lack of eye contact, pointing behavior, and lack of facial responses
 Unusual play with toys and other objects.
 Paranoia, a characteristic form of social anxiety, derealization, transient psychosis, and unconventional beliefs if environment or routine are changed without notice
 Repetitive body movements or behavior patterns, such as hand flapping, hair twirling, foot tapping, or more complex movements
 Difficulty regulating behaviors and emotions, which may result in temper tantrums, anxiety, and aggression
 Emotional breakdowns
 Delusional or unconventional perception of the world
 Maladaptive daydreaming
 Mirrored-Self Misidentification – the delusion that the individual in the mirror that you are, is a child, even though you are an older teen or an adult

Degrees
Children with PDD vary widely in abilities, intelligence, and behaviors. Some children do not speak at all, others speak in limited phrases or conversations, and some have relatively normal language development. Repetitive play skills and limited social skills are generally evident. Unusual responses to sensory information – loud noises, lights – are common.

Diagnosis
Diagnosis is usually made during early childhood. Individuals who received diagnoses based on the DSM-IV maintain their diagnosis under the autism spectrum disorders. However, an editorial published in the October 2012 issue of American Journal of Psychiatry notes that, while some doctors argue that there is insufficient evidence to support the diagnostic distinction between ASD and PDD, multiple literature reviews found that studies showing significant differences between the two disorders significantly outnumbered those that found no difference.

The World Health Organization’s International Classification of Diseases, 10th edition (ICD-10) categorized PDD into four distinct subtypes, each with their own diagnostic criteria. The four disorders (childhood autism, atypical autism, Rett syndrome, and other childhood disintegrative disorder) are characterized by abnormalities in social interactions and communication.

The disorders were primarily diagnosed based on behavioral features, although the presence of any medical conditions are important, they are not taken into account when making a diagnosis.

Before the release of the DSM-V, some clinicians used PDD-NOS as a "temporary" diagnosis for children under the age of five when, for whatever reason, they are reluctant to diagnose autism. There are several justifications for this. Very young children have limited social interaction and communication skills to begin with, so it can be tricky to diagnose milder cases of autism in toddlers. The unspoken assumption is that by the age of five, unusual behaviors will either resolve or develop into diagnosable autism. However, some parents view the PDD label as no more than a euphemism for autism spectrum disorders, problematic because this label makes it more difficult to receive aid for early childhood intervention.

Classification
The pervasive developmental disorders were:
 Pervasive developmental disorder not otherwise specified (PDD-NOS), which includes atypical autism, and is the most common (47% of autism diagnoses);
 Typical autism, the best-known;
 Asperger syndrome (9% of autism diagnoses);
 Rett syndrome; and
 Childhood disintegrative disorder (CDD).
The first three of these disorders are commonly called the autism spectrum disorders; the last two disorders are much rarer, and are sometimes placed in the autism spectrum and sometimes not.

In May 2013, the Diagnostic and Statistical Manual–5th Edition (DSM-V) was released, updating the classification for pervasive developmental disorders. The grouping of disorders, including PDD-NOS, Autism, Asperger Syndrome, Rett Syndrome, and CDD, has been removed and replaced with the general term of Autism Spectrum Disorders. The American Psychiatric Association has concluded that using the general diagnosis of ASD supports more accurate diagnoses. The combination of these disorders was also fueled by the standpoint that Autism is characterized by common symptoms and should therefore bear a single diagnostic term. In order to distinguish between the different disorders, the DSM-V employs severity levels. The severity levels take into account required support, restricted interests and repetitive behaviors, and deficits in social communication.

PDD and PDD-NOS
There is a division among doctors on the use of the term PDD. Many use the term PDD as a short way of saying PDD-NOS. Others use the general category because the term PDD actually refers to a category of disorders and is not a diagnostic label.

PDD is not itself a diagnosis, while PDD-NOS is a diagnosis. To further complicate the issue, PDD-NOS can also be referred to as "atypical personality development", "atypical PDD", or "atypical Autism".

Behavior 
An association between high-functioning autism (HFA) and criminal behavior is not completely characterized. Several studies have shown that the features associated with HFA may increase the probability of engaging in criminal behavior. While there is still a great deal of research that needs to be done in this area, recent studies on the correlation between HFA and criminal actions suggest that there is a need to understand the attributes of HFA that may lead to violent behavior. There have been several case studies that link the lack of empathy and social naïveté associated with HFA to criminal actions.

There is still needs more research on the link between HFA and crimes, because most other studies point out that most people with ASD are ten times more likely to be victims and five times less likely to commit crimes than the general population. But there are also small-subgroups of people with Low-functioning Autism that commit crimes, because lack of understanding of the laws.

Treatment

Medications are used to address certain behavioral problems; therapy for children with PDD should be specialized according to the child's specific needs.

Some children with PDD benefit from specialized classrooms in which the class size is small and instruction is given on a one-to-one basis. Others function well in standard special education classes or regular classes with support. Early intervention, including appropriate and specialized educational programs and support services, play a critical role in improving the outcome of individuals with PDD.

See also
 Infantile neuroaxonal dystrophy
 Multiple complex developmental disorder
 Multisystem developmental disorder
 Overactive disorder associated with mental retardation and stereotyped movements

References

External links 
 CDC's "Learn the Signs. Act Early." campaign - Information for parents on early childhood development and developmental disabilities
 NINFS Pervasive Developmental Disorders Information Page

 
Special education
Neurological disorders in children
Learning disabilities
Autism spectrum disorders

he:הפרעה התפתחותית נרחבת
sv:Autismspektrumstörning